Orexigen Therapeutics is a public American pharmaceutical company focused on development of treatments for obesity. The company is based in La Jolla, California and was established by Eckard Weber in 2002.  As a public company, Orexigen is traded on the NASDAQ exchange under the stock symbol OREX. 

The company has a single product, Contrave, approved for use in the United States in 2014. Contrave was designed not only to curb hunger but also reduce cravings. Observation of the market performance of Qsymia and Belviq suggest overall low demand for pharmaceutical obesity therapies, calling into question earnings potential for Orexigen's offering. 

Orexigen declared bankruptcy in 2018 and was sold to Nalpropion.

References

Health care companies based in California
Pharmaceutical companies established in 2002
Pharmaceutical companies of the United States
Companies listed on the Nasdaq
2002 establishments in California